Kharg District is in Bushehr County, Bushehr province, Iran. At the 2006 census, its population was 8,196 in 1,963 households. The following census in 2011 counted 7,722 people in 2,115 households. At the latest census in 2016, the district had 8,193 inhabitants living in 2,374 households.

References 

Districts of Bushehr Province
Populated places in Bushehr County